Gradient sro is a Czech aircraft manufacturer based in Prague and founded in 1997. The company specializes in the design and manufacture of paragliders in the form of ready-to-fly aircraft.

The company is organized as a společnost s ručením omezeným (sro), a Czech private limited company.

The company has produced a wide range of paragliders, including the intermediate sport Aspen, the Avax competition wing, the two-place tandem BiOnyx, the intermediate performance Bliss, the beginner and flight training Bright and the intermediate Golden

The company has ceased publishing performance specifications for its gliders, stating:

Aircraft 

Summary of aircraft built by Gradient:

Gradient Agility
Gradient Aspen
Gradient Avax
Gradient BiGolden
Gradient BiOnyx
Gradient Bliss
Gradient Bright
Gradient Delite
Gradient Denali
Gradient Eiger
Gradient Freestyle
Gradient Golden
Gradient Montana
Gradient Nevada

References

External links

Aircraft manufacturers of the Czech Republic and Czechoslovakia
Paragliders
Manufacturing companies established in 1997
Czech companies established in 1997